Rosaria Yusfin Pungkasari (born 22 July 1987) is an Indonesian badminton player affiliated with Djarum club. She was part of the Indonesian junior team that played at the 2005 Asian Junior Championships, clinched the girls' team bronze medal after defeated by the Chinese team in the semifinal. Pungkasari has collected four Sircuit National titles from 2007-2012, and at the National Championships, she once a semifinalist in 2011. Pungkasari was the runner-up in Grand Prix tournament at the 2008 Bulgaria Open defeated by Petya Nedelcheva in the final. She won her first international title at the 2010 Indonesia International Challenge tournament.

Achievements

BWF Grand Prix 
The BWF Grand Prix had two levels, the Grand Prix and Grand Prix Gold. It was a series of badminton tournaments sanctioned by the Badminton World Federation (BWF) and played between 2007 and 2017.

Women's singles

  BWF Grand Prix Gold tournament
  BWF Grand Prix tournament

BWF International Challenge/Series 
Women's singles

  BWF International Challenge tournament
  BWF International Series tournament

References

External links 
 

1987 births
Living people
People from Temanggung Regency
Sportspeople from Central Java
Indonesian female badminton players
20th-century Indonesian women
21st-century Indonesian women